Khalid Taha (born February 15, 1992) is a German mixed martial artist currently competing in the bantamweight division. A professional since 2013, he has fought in the Ultimate Fighting Championship and Rizin Fighting Federation.

Mixed martial arts career

Early career
Taha started fighting MMA professionally in 2013. He has fought under numerous organizations, notably German MMA Championship, Fair Fighting Championship and Rizin Fighting Federation.

Ultimate Fighting Championship
Taha  made his UFC debut on  July 22, 2018, at UFC Fight Night: Shogun vs. Smith against Nad Narimani.  He lost the fight via unanimous decision.

Taha was scheduled to face Boston Salmon on November 30, 2018, at The Ultimate Fighter: Heavy Hitters#The Ultimate Fighter 28 Finale. However Taha was pulled from the event due to a torn ACL and the bout was cancelled. The pairing was rescheduled at UFC 236  on April 13, 2019. He won the fight via technical knockout in round one.

Taha was scheduled to face Bruno Gustavo da Silva on September 7, 2019, at UFC 242.  However, on August 21, it was reported that the bout was moved to UFC 243. Taha won the fight via a submission in round three. On December 23, 2019, Taha received one year USADA suspension for tested positive for  furosemide (diuretics) in an in-competition urine sample provided on Oct. 6 2019 where Taha took a medicine for reducing inflammation and swelling in his eyes which contained furosemide. He became eligible to compete again on October 6, 2020.

Taha was expected to face Jack Shore on November 7, 2020, at UFC on ESPN: Santos vs. Teixeira. However, Shore was removed from the bout in late-October due to undisclosed reasons and replaced by Raoni Barcelos. Taha lost the fight via unanimous decision.  This fight earned him the Fight of the Night award.

Taha faced Sergey Morozov on July 17, 2021, at UFC on ESPN 26. He lost the fight via unanimous decision.

Taha was scheduled to face Mario Bautista on February 19, 2022, at UFC Fight Night 201. However, Taha had to pull out off the bout due to undisclosed reasons.

Taha  was scheduled to face  Taylor Lapilus on September 3, 2022, at UFC Fight Night 209.; but on  August 23, Lapilus forfeited from the event due to a broken hand, and he was replaced by Cristian Quiñónez. He lost the fight via technical knockout in round one.

After the loss, it was announced that Taha was no longer on the UFC roster.

Championships and accomplishments

Mixed martial arts
Ultimate Fighting Championship
Fight of the Night (One time)

Personal life
Taha is of Lebanese descent.

Mixed martial arts record 

|-
|Loss
|align=center|13–5 (1)
|Cristian Quiñónez
|TKO (punches)
|UFC Fight Night: Gane vs. Tuivasa
|
|align=center|1
|align=center|3:15
|Paris, France
|
|-
|Loss
|align=center|13–4 (1)
|Sergey Morozov
|Decision (unanimous)
|UFC on ESPN: Makhachev vs. Moisés 
|
|align=center|3
|align=center|5:00
|Las Vegas, Nevada, United States
|
|-
|Loss
|align=center|13–3 (1)
|Raoni Barcelos
|Decision (unanimous)
|UFC on ESPN: Santos vs. Teixeira
|
|align=center|3
|align=center|5:00
|Las Vegas, Nevada, United States
|
|-
|NC
|align=center|13–2 (1)
|Bruno Gustavo da Silva
|NC (overturned)
|UFC 243 
|
|align=center|3
|align=center|3:00
|Melbourne, Australia
|
|-
|Win
|align=center|13–2
|Boston Salmon
|TKO (punches)
|UFC 236
|
|align=center|1
|align=center|0:25
|Atlanta, Georgia, United States
|
|-
|Loss
|align=center|12–2
|Nad Narimani
|Decision (unanimous)
|UFC Fight Night: Shogun vs. Smith
|
|align=center|3
|align=center|5:00
|Hamburg, Germany
|
|-
|Win
|align=center|12–1
|Hamza Kooheji
|Submission (rear-naked choke)
|Brave 12
|
|align=center|2
|align=center|N/A
|Jakarta, Indonesia
|
|-
|Loss
|align=center|11–1
|Takafumi Otsuka
|Submission (guillotine choke)
|Rizin Fighting World Grand Prix 2017: 2nd Round
|
|align=center|3
|align=center|3:23
|Saitama, Japan
|
|-
|Win
|align=center|11–0
|Keita Ishibashi
|KO (knees and punches)
|Rizin World Grand Prix 2017: Opening Round - Part 1
|
|align=center|1
|align=center|4:52
|Saitama, Japan
|
|-
|Win
|align=center|10–0
|Timo-Juhani Hirvikangas
|Decision (split)
|German MMA Championship 9
|
|align=center|3
|align=center|5:00
|Castrop-Rauxel, Germany
|
|-
|Win
|align=center|9–0
|Michail Chrisopoulos
|KO (punch)
|Fair FC 5
|
|align=center|1
|align=center|1:20
|Eindhoven, Netherlands
|
|-
|Win
|align=center|8–0
|Nijat Valujev
|TKO (punches)
|Fair FC: Top Ten Champions
|
|align=center|1
|align=center|2:26
|Herne, Germany
|
|-
|Win
|align=center|7–0
|Daniel Makin
|TKO (punches)
|Fair FC 4
|
|align=center|1
|align=center|2:20
|Eindhoven, Netherlands
|
|-
|Win
|align=center|6–0
|Omer Cankardesler
|Decision (unanimous)
|Fair FC 3
|
|align=center|3
|align=center|5:00
|Rheinberg, Germany
|
|-
|Win
|align=center|5–0
|Ali Selcuk Ayin
|TKO (submission to punches)
|German MMA Championship 5
|
|align=center|1
|align=center|4:59
|Herne, Germany
|
|-
|Win
|align=center|4–0
|Manuel Bilić
|Submission (rear-naked choke)
|Fair FC 1
|
|align=center|2
|align=center|4:24
|Herne, Germany
|
|-
|Win
|align=center|3–0
|Florin Gârdan
|TKO (knees)
|RNC: Martial Arts Gala
|
|align=center|2
|align=center|4:43
|Frankenthal, Germany
|
|-
|Win
|align=center|2–0
|John Isac
|TKO (punches)
|GMC 4
|
|align=center|2
|align=center|0:20
|Herne, Germany
|
|-
|Win
|align=center|1–0
|Muhammed Celebi
|TKO (punches)
|MMA Bundesliga 2
|
|align=center|2
|align=center|2:43
|Herne, Germany
|
|-

See also
 List of male mixed martial artists

References

External links
 
 

1992 births
Living people
German male mixed martial artists
Bantamweight mixed martial artists
Mixed martial artists utilizing taekwondo
Mixed martial artists utilizing Brazilian jiu-jitsu
German practitioners of Brazilian jiu-jitsu
German male taekwondo practitioners
German people of Lebanese descent
Sportspeople from Dortmund
People from Warendorf
Sportspeople from Münster (region)
Ultimate Fighting Championship male fighters
Doping cases in mixed martial arts